Elizabeth Harris  may refer to:

People
Ordered chronologically
 Elizabeth Glover (née Harris; 1602–1643), responsible for bring the first printing press to the Thirteen Colonies
 Elizabeth Harris (died 1812), wife of Supreme Court Justice Thomas Todd
 Elizabeth Underwood (née Harris; 1794–1858), Australian pioneering land owner
 Eliza Harris (Civil War nurse)(1831–1891), volunteer nurse in the American Civil War
 Elizabeth Webber Harris (1834–1917), English nurse awarded a replica Victoria Cross for her work during a cholera outbreak in India
 Liz Harris (fl. 1962–1993), Australian actress
 Elizabeth Anne Harris (born 1980), American musician, artist and producer musician, stage name Grouper
 Elizabeth Harris (born 1997), American rapper, stage name Cupcakke

Fictional characters
 Elizabeth Harris, in the 2011 film Unknown

See also
 Betty Harris (born 1939), American singer
 Betty Harris (scientist) (born 1940), American scientist
 Elizabeth-Jane Harris (born 1988), British cyclist
 Eliza Harris, a character in Uncle Tom's Cabin